was a Japanese football player, manager, and referee. He played for Japan national team. He also managed Japan national team.

Club career
Takenokoshi was born in Usuki on February 15, 1906. He played for Tokyo Imperial University LB was consisted of his alma mater Tokyo Imperial University players and graduates. He also played for Tokyo OB Club and won 1933 Emperor's Cup with Shiro Teshima and Teiichi Matsumaru.

National team career
In May 1925, when Takenokoshi was a Tokyo Imperial University student, he was selected Japan national team for 1925 Far Eastern Championship Games in Manila. At this competition, on May 20, he debuted against Republic of China. He also played at 1927 in Shanghai and 1930 Far Eastern Championship Games in Tokyo. At 1927 Far Eastern Championship Games, on August 29, he scored a goal against Philippines and Japan won this match. This is Japan national team first victory in International A Match. At 1930 Far Eastern Championship Games, he led Japan to the champions as captain. He played 5 games and scored 1 goal for Japan until 1930.

Coaching career
In 1934, Takenokoshi was named manager for Japan national team for the 1934 Far Eastern Championship Games in Manila. In 1936, he served as assistant coach under manager Shigeyoshi Suzuki for 1936 Summer Olympics in Berlin. Japan completed a come-from-behind victory against Sweden. The first victory in Olympics for the Japan and the historic victory over one of the powerhouses became later known as "Miracle of Berlin" (ベルリンの奇跡) in Japan. In 2016, this team was selected Japan Football Hall of Fame. He also managed Japan from 1938 to 1940.

After World War II, in 1951, Takenokoshi became a manager for Japan as Hirokazu Ninomiya successor again. He managed at 1954 Asian Games and 1956 Summer Olympics. After 1956 Summer Olympics, he resigned. In 1958, he became a manager for Japan as Taizo Kawamoto successor again. However, in December 1959, at 1960 Summer Olympics qualification, following Japan's failure to qualify for 1960 Summer Olympics, he stepped down as manager.

On October 6, 1980, Takenokoshi died of stroke in Bunkyo, Tokyo at the age of 74. In 2005, he was selected Japan Football Hall of Fame.

National team statistics

References

External links
 
 Japan National Football Team Database
Japan Football Hall of Fame at Japan Football Association
Japan Football Hall of Fame (Japan team at 1936 Olympics) at Japan Football Association
 Profile at Archive.footballjapan.jp

1906 births
1980 deaths
University of Tokyo alumni
Association football people from Ōita Prefecture
Japanese footballers
Japan international footballers
Japanese football managers
Japan national football team managers
Japanese football referees
Football referees at the 1956 Summer Olympics
Association football midfielders
Presidents of the Japan Futsal Federation